Americans in Germany or  American Germans (German: Amerikanische Deutsche 
or Amerikodeutsche) refers to the American population in Germany and their German-born descendants. According to Destatis, 300,000 - 400,000 Americans live in Germany. 200,000 of them in Rhineland-Palatinate. 

At the same time, more than 40,000 members of the US military and 15,000 civilian employees of American citizenship are permanently in Germany, with a strong presence in Kaiserslautern, which in the 1950s became the largest US military community outside of the United States. In addition, there are significant numbers of American expatriates in Germany, especially professionals sent abroad by their companies and an increasing number of college students and graduates (also due to the affordable higher education system and the favorable quality of life). By December 2013, the largest American diasporas in Germany are Rhineland-Palatinate with over 50,000. Berlin with over 16,000 people, and the area around Darmstadt with about 13,000 people.

Military backgrounds

A large portion of the American-German population has a military background. Great numbers of American soldiers were stationed in Germany after World War II. The Occupation statute of 1949 set regulations for the post-war time within Allied-occupied Germany. Numerous American military installations were established during this time, and eventually hundreds were in place, mainly in Southern Germany. At the time of German Reunification in 1990, there were still about 200,000 US soldiers in Germany. By 2014, the number had been steadily reduced to 42,450 stationed in 38 facilities.

During World War II General Dwight D. Eisenhower and the American War Department enforced a strict non-fraternization policy regarding contact between American military personnel and German citizens. After the war this prohibition was mitigated in several steps and finally abandoned in Austria and Germany in September 1945. In the earliest stages of the Allied occupation US soldiers were not allowed to pay maintenance for a child they admitted having fathered, since to do so was considered as "aiding the enemy". Marriages between white American soldiers and German women were not permitted until December 1946.

Notable American-Germans
Baldur von Schirach, head of the Hitler Youth.
Manfred Curry, Olympic sailor, yacht designer and medical practitioner
Kirsten Dunst, American actress of German descent, holds German citizenship.
David Garrett, pop artist and violinist.
Ernst Hanfstaengl, ex-Nazi and intelligence worker for the Americans during World War II.
Emil Jannings, actor.
Carlos Kleiber, German-born Austrian conductor.
Boris Kodjoe, Austrian-born American actor. Ghanaian father and German mother.
Dee Dee Ramone, American-born bassist and songwriter (Ramones).
Bruce Willis, actor.

In sports
Terrence Boyd, football player (Hallescher FC)
John Brooks, football player (VfL Wolfsburg)
Lamont Bryan, German-born Jamaican rugby player (London Skolars)
Timothy Chandler, football player (Eintracht Frankfurt)
Royal-Dominique Fennell, football player (1899 Hoffenheim II)
Julian Green, American-born football player (Greuther Fürth)
Demond Greene, American-born former basketball player
Elias Harris, basketball player
Jimmy Hartwig, retired football player
Jermaine Jones, retired football player
Chris Kaman, retired basketball player
Jerome Kiesewetter, football player
Donald Lutz, American-born retired baseball player
Felix Magath, manager and retired football player
Alfredo Morales, football player (Fortuna Düsseldorf)
Danny Williams, football player
Del-Angelo Williams, football player (SV Elversberg)
Andrew Wooten, football player (Philadelphia Union)
David Yelldell, retired football player
José Holebas, football player (Olympiacos)
 Alex King
 Fabian Johnson

Organizations of Americans in Germany
 Democrats Abroad Germany
 American Culture Club

See also
 Emigration from the United States
 German American for Americans of German descent
 Immigration to Germany

References

 
Germany
American emigration
Ethnic groups in Germany
German people of American descent
Immigration to Germany